Abu Hena ( - 14 November 2020) was a Bangladesh Nationalist Party politician and the former Member of Parliament of Rajshahi-3.

Career
Hena was elected to parliament from Rajshahi-3 as a Bangladesh Nationalist Party candidate in June 1996 and 2001. He was expelled from Bangladesh Nationalist Party for criticizing the party for not tackling Islamic extremism.

Hena died from COVID-19 on 14 November 2020, at a hospital in Shyamoli, Dhaka.

References

2020 deaths
People from Rajshahi District
Bangladesh Nationalist Party politicians
7th Jatiya Sangsad members
8th Jatiya Sangsad members
Deaths from the COVID-19 pandemic in Bangladesh
Year of birth missing
Place of birth missing
1930s births